Indonesia fielded a team of 54 student-athletes in nine sports held at the 2011 Summer Universiade in Shenzhen, China.

Medalists

Athletics

Women

10,000 m Final

Gymnastics

Indonesia's aerobic gymnastics trio qualified but did not medal.

Swimming

Indonesia sent a men's and women's swimming team of 8 swimmers.

Men

Women

References

Nations at the 2011 Summer Universiade
2011 in Indonesian sport
Indonesia at the Summer Universiade